Jerome P. “Jerry” McDermott was the 22nd High Sheriff of Norfolk County.  He was appointed sheriff by Governor Baker in December 2018 after the resignation of Michael G. Bellotti. He was defeated by Patrick McDermott (no relation) in the November 2020 special election, 60%-40%. Massachusetts Majority PAC, a Super PAC with close ties to Massachusetts Governor Charlie Baker, spent $167,148 on his behalf which made him the biggest beneficiary of the super PAC's spending.

McDermott grew up in the Allston-Brighton region of Boston, where he was involved in groups such as the Ward 22 Democratic Committee and the Oak Square YMCA.

His career began as a legislative aide to Congressman Joseph P. Kennedy II, and subsequently Boston City Council President Bruce Bolling. He served on the Boston City Council and as the executive director of South Shore Habitat for Humanity.  He also served as State Director for Senator Scott Brown and worked in community relations and economic development for Eversource.  In March 2018 he was appointed as chief of staff in the Massachusetts Division of Capital Asset Management and Maintenance in the administration of Governor Charlie Baker.

While serving on the city council, he was a registered Democrat, but unenrolled from the party in 2010.  He registered as a Republican in 2013.  In 2006, as a councilor, he proposed that the Boston Citgo sign be removed in response to Venezuelan President Hugo Chávez's insults toward U.S. President George W. Bush. McDermott also suggested draping an American flag or Boston Red Sox banner over the sign until Chávez was out of office. McDermott was the Chairman of the Post Audit & Oversight Committee when he called for transparency and hearings on a controversial land deal between the Boston Redevelopment Authority (BRA) and the Islamic Society of Boston (ISB). Councilor McDermott is probably best remembered for his advocacy for school children in the wake of the Archdiocese of Boston's Clergy Sexual Abuse scandal and the aftermath that caused schools to be closed.

McDermott lives in Westwood, Massachusetts.

References

Living people
People from Boston
People from Westwood, Massachusetts
High Sheriffs of Norfolk County
Boston City Council members
Massachusetts Republicans
Year of birth missing (living people)
University of Massachusetts Boston alumni